The 1974 Baltimore International was a men's tennis tournament played on indoor carpet courts at the Towson State College in Baltimore, Maryland in the United States that was part of the 1974 USLTA Indoor Circuit. It was the third edition of the event and was held from January 29 through February 3, 1974. Sandy Mayer won the singles title.

Finals

Singles
 Sandy Mayer defeated  Clark Graebner 6–2, 6–1
 It was Mayer' 1st singles title of the year and the 2nd of his career.

Doubles
 Jürgen Fassbender /  Karl Meiler defeated  Owen Davidson /  Clark Graebner 7–6, 7–5

References

External links
 ITF tournament edition details

Baltimore International
Baltimore International
Baltimore International
Baltimore International